H17 or H-17 may refer to:
 British NVC community H17, a type of heath community in the British National Vegetation Classification
 Buffalo Municipal Airport (Missouri)
 German H17-206, a German steam locomotive
 Heaven 17, an English electronic band
 Highway H17 (Ukraine), a road in Ukraine
 , a Royal Navy E-class destroyer
 , a H-class submarine order by but never commissioned into the Royal Navy
 Hughes H-17, an American helicopter project
 London Buses route H17, a Transport for London contracted bus route